Pursuant to Article 53 of the Law on Internal Regulations of the Islamic Consultative Assembly (Parliament of the Islamic Republic of Iran), the  Internal Affairs of the Country and Councils Commission of the Islamic Consultative Assembly is formed to perform its assigned duties within the scope of domestic policy, councils, non-civil affairs of municipalities and civil registration in accordance with the provisions of the regulation.

The Internal Affairs of the Country and Councils Commission of the Islamic Consultative Assembly is defined as the equivalent of the Ministry of Interior in the structure of government ministries (executive branch). The Ministry of Interior and, consequently, the Internal Affairs of the Country and Councils Commission are primarily responsible for dealing with "internal affairs of the country".

Scope of duties and authorities 
The important outlines of the issues examined by Internal Affairs of the Country and Councils Commission and the scope of its duties and authorities can be categorized as follows:

Supervisory priorities 
The supervisory priorities of the Internal Affairs of the Country and Councils Commission include the following:

 Make the Islamic councils of cities and villages efficient and pursue the comprehensive urban management bill
 Pursue the presentation of the bill of the comprehensive law of national divisions
 Supervising the proper implementation of the "Law on Transparency and Supervision of Financing of Electoral Activities in the Islamic Consultative Assembly Elections"

Members 
The members of the Internal Affairs of the Country and Councils Commission of the Islamic Consultative Assembly in the second year of the 11th term of the Assembly are as follows:

See also 
 Program, Budget and Accounting Commission of the Islamic Consultative Assembly
 Education, Research and Technology Commission of the Islamic Consultative Assembly
 Social Commission of the Islamic Consultative Assembly
 Health and Medical Commission of the Islamic Consultative Assembly
 Industries and Mines Commission of the Islamic Consultative Assembly
 Special Commission of the Islamic Consultative Assembly
 The history of the parliament in Iran

References

Committees of the Iranian Parliament
Islamic Consultative Assembly